Jennifer Dy Chan (born January 16, 1965) is a Filipino archer who has competed for the Philippines at the 2000 Summer Olympics. She is a resident of Dumaguete.

Education
Chan attended the Silliman University where she obtained a bachelor's degree in general science.

Career
Siliman University physical education instructor and Philippine national archery coach, Dionisio Flores encouraged Chan to take up archery. Before then, Chan was more into basketball and tennis but was convinced since she was told that archery is a sport she could play by herself. Chan trained for eight months before participating at the National Open which gave her a chance to compete in the Southeast Asian Games. According to World Archery, She took up archery in 1989 and debuted for her country in 1990.

Chan first competed in the 1991 edition of the Southeast Asian Games though she didn't medal.

At the 2000 Summer Olympics, Jennifer Chan competed in the women's individual event. She conceded a 143-160 defeat to a Turkish competitor in the first round and finish with a ranking of 59th out of 64 competitors. She then coached Mark Javier who competed in the Archery at the 2008 Summer Olympics.

She won the gold medal at the women’s individual compound event at the 2009 Southeast Asian Games winning 115-112 over Aung Ngeain. Her 2009 participation was supposed to be her last though she participated in the 2011, 2015, and 2017 editions. She won a silver in women's individual in 2011 and a bronze in the women's team event in 2015.

At the 2011 Archery World Cup in Shanghai, she was part of the Philippine team that won a bronze in the women's compound team event.

References

Olympic archers of the Philippines
Archers at the 2000 Summer Olympics
Filipino female archers
1965 births
Living people
Archers at the 2002 Asian Games
Southeast Asian Games medalists in archery
Southeast Asian Games gold medalists for the Philippines
Southeast Asian Games competitors for the Philippines
Competitors at the 2017 Southeast Asian Games
Asian Games competitors for the Philippines